Akim A. Anastopoulo (born October 14, 1960 in Charleston, South Carolina) is an American lawyer and television personality. He played the starring role of judge on National Lampoon's syndicated court show, Eye for an Eye, from 2003 through 2009.  On the court show, Anastopoulo went by "Judge Extreme Akim," a nickname derived from his bizarre and draconian forms of punishment on the program. He runs a law firm in South Carolina called The Anastopoulo Law Firm.

Education
Anastopoulo received a four-year tennis scholarship to the University of Louisville, where he received the "Most Outstanding Athlete" and "Most Outstanding Graduating Senior" Awards. He also won the "Mr. Cardinal" award and was voted senior class president. Earning his Bachelor of Arts in 1982, he then went to the University of South Carolina for his Juris Doctor in 1985.

Professional
Anastopoulo is the owner of the Anastopoulo Law Firm, LLC, based in Charleston, South Carolina. He specializes in personal injury, automobile accidents and injuries, premises liability, and products liability and his firm has received 7 of the top 10 largest jury verdicts in 2017 in the state of South Carolina in one year. He has litigation experience in civil, criminal, class action and state and federal appeals cases. Anastopoulo has been practicing law in South Carolina for over 30 years.

In 1993 and 1996, Anastopoulo successfully defended college football coach Charlie Taaffe for two separate DUI charges. Taaffe was acquitted of drunken driving in February.  After which, Anastopoulo filed and recovered for Taaffe's wrongful termination from his employer, The Citadel military college. Taaffe’s attorney, Akim Anastopoulo, said "The coach is pleased to have the ordeal behind him and is interested in coaching again." The settlement specified that Taaffe "led the college’s football program with skill and integrity.″   Anastopoulo said Taaffe has had several job interviews. 

Anastopoulo went on to handle several high profile cases following the Taaffe cases, including an Air Force veteran charged in the drowning deaths of his two sons. 

In 2005, Anastopoulo canceled his voluntary membership in the South Carolina Trial Lawyers' Association. No reason was given by Anastopoulo for the withdrawal, but it did coincide with a decision by the South Carolina Supreme Court to ban the use of catchy nicknames by attorneys. At the time, Anastopoulo was using the nickname "The Strong Arm" in all of his advertising. By his own account, he had spent "hundreds of thousands of dollars" developing his brand name.

Anastopoulo is a former state prosecutor. He has been admitted to the United States District Court for the District of South Carolina, the South Carolina Supreme Court, the U.S. Court of Federal Claims (in 1998), and the U.S. Court of Appeals, Fourth Circuit (1999).

Anastopoulo has built one of the most successful law firms in the state of South Carolina with offices across the state.  In July 2008, a Charleston County jury awarded Anastopoulo's client what was believed to be a record-setting damages verdict of $50 million at the time to a woman whose husband was killed 5 years before in an accident involving a driver that police say should have never been behind the wheel. Anastopoulo said at the time, "We obtained a verdict for our client that we believe to be the highest actual damage verdict ever awarded in [Charleston County]."

Anastopoulo hosted a fundraiser for Hillary Clinton's 2016 presidential campaign in South Carolina in June 2015.

In 2020, in the wake of the COVID-19 pandemic, Anastopoulo and his law firm filed suits in federal court in Charleston, where Anastopoulo’s firm is located and where the name plaintiffs in the suits live. He has filed 16 more class actions against colleges and universities around the nation, defendants include Columbia and the University of Pennsylvania, in an attempt to secure refunds for students whose semesters were cut short due to the pandemic. “We’ve gotten thousands of inquiries from students and we’re investigating dozens of universities,” he says.

Eye for an Eye

Anastopoulo was approached to be the judge on Eye for an Eye in 2003, to which he agreed. Anastopoulo is known on the court show by nickname Judge "Extreme Akim". Eye for an Eye concluded its run in 2009.

Being that it was a pseudo-court show in an era in which most court programming used an arbitration-based reality format, Eye for an Eye was a nontraditional series within the judicial genre. The program was unusual among courtroom shows for its lack of courtroom decorum: When Big Sugar Ray Phillips instructed the audience to rise for Judge Akim's entrance, the audience rose all awhile cheering and chanting "Extreme Akim" repeatedly. They were frequently heard in a state of frenzy throughout the course of the hearings, blurting out remarks in unison. 

Atlas Worldwide Syndications and Distributions announced in 2006, that their reality courtroom television series Eye for an Eye, had cleared the Los Angeles market for the 2006-2007 season. The show aired on KCAL Monday-Friday at 9 and 9:30 am took over Tony Danza’s slot. KCAL said, "Eye for an Eye is coming off a successful premiere season and has cleared over 80% of the country for the 2006-2007 season." Matt Slechter, VP of Sales and Marketing for Atlas Worldwide Syndications and Distributions said, “We are thrilled to be working with KCAL/KCBS and are thankful for the support they have given the program. We consider this to be a big leap forward for us in the Los Angeles Market and for the show as a whole. We are extremely happy the show has been such a success.” The show cleared in 14 of the top 15 markets and 80 percent of the country. 

Eye for an Eye captured the essence of justice and puts punishment front and center. A non-traditional, no-nonsense, no-holds-barred spectacle of trial and punishment, the syndicated reality courtroom show broke ground and took small claims court to places viewers have never seen. Unlike any other courtroom television program, Eye for an Eye features the powerful and enigmatic Judge “Extreme Akim” sentencing his litigants to “paybacks” with signature punishment episodes. Anastopoulo worked alongside Sugar Ray Phillips (former middleweight boxing champion of the world) as bailiff and Kato Kaelin. The three remain friends to this day.

Awards
In 2006, 2007, 2008 and 2009 a reader's poll by Charleston Citypaper voted Mr. Anastopoulo as the "Best Lawyer/Law Firm" in Charleston.

On April 26th, 2006 Anastopoulo, his wife, and two daughters attended the 33rd Daytime Emmy Awards at the Kodak Theatre in Hollywood, California. Where Anastopoulo was considers for an daytime Emmy for his role as Judge "Extreme Akim" on the series "Eye for an Eye."

References

Living people
American people of Greek descent
1960 births
University of South Carolina alumni
University of Louisville alumni
Television judges